Kamiyugi Park Athletic Stadium (上柚木公園　陸上競技場), also known as Kamiyugi Stadium or Kamiyugi Koen Field, is a Category 2 athletic field authorised by the Japan Association of Athletics Federations and located in Hachioji, Tokyo, Japan.

Overview
It has an area of 106 by 69.5 meters and a lap length of 400 meters, with eight lanes. It has an all-weather track and photo finish equipment.

Transport
The stadium is about 20 minutes on foot from Minami-ōsawa Station on the Keio Sagamihara Line or it can be reached by bus from the South Exit of Hachioji Station operated by East Japan Railway Company (JR East).

External links
 Website of  Bureau of Tokyo 2020 Olympic and Paralympic Games
 Website of The Tokyo Organising Committee of the Olympic and Paralympic Games

Athletics (track and field) venues in Japan
Rugby union stadiums in Japan
Sports venues in Tokyo
Hachiōji, Tokyo